The tribe Dasyurini includes several genera of small carnivorous marsupials native to Australia: quolls, kowari, mulgara, kaluta, dibblers, neophascogales, pseudantechinuses, and the Tasmanian devil.

Classification 
 Tribe Dasyurini
 Genus Dasycercus
 Brush-tailed mulgara, Dasycercus blythi
 Crest-tailed mulgara, Dasycercus cristicauda
 Genus Dasykaluta
 Little red kaluta, Dasykaluta rosamondae
 Genus Dasyuroides
 Kowari, Dasyuroides byrnei
 Genus Dasyurus: quolls
 New Guinean quoll, Dasyurus albopunctatus
 Western quoll, Dasyurus geoffroii
 Northern quoll, Dasyurus hallucatus
 Tiger quoll, Dasyurus maculatus
 Bronze quoll, Dasyurus spartacus
 Eastern quoll, Dasyurus viverrinus
 Genus Myoictis
 Myoictis leucura
 Three-striped dasyure, Myoictis melas
 Wallace's dasyure, Myoictis wallacii
 Myoictis wavicus
 Genus Neophascogale
 Speckled dasyure, Neophascogale lorentzi
 Genus Parantechinus
 Dibbler, Parantechinus apicalis
 Genus Phascolosorex
 Red-bellied marsupial shrew, Phascolosorex doriae
 Narrow-striped marsupial shrew, Phascolosorex dorsalis
 Genus Pseudantechinus
 Sandstone false antechinus, Pseudantechinus bilarni
 Fat-tailed false antechinus, Pseudantechinus macdonnellensis
 Alexandria false antechinus, Pseudantechinus mimulus
 Ningbing false antechinus, Pseudantechinus ningbing
 Rory Cooper's false antechinus, Pseudantechinus roryi
 Woolley's false antechinus, Pseudantechinus woolleyae
 Genus Sarcophilus
 Tasmanian devil, Sarcophilus harrisii

References

Dasyuromorphs
Mammal tribes